Atelura is a genus of primitive insects belonging to the order Zygentoma.

References

Fauna Europaea

Zygentoma
Insect genera